The Philippines men's national basketball team represents the Philippines in international basketball competitions. It is managed by the Samahang Basketbol ng Pilipinas (Basketball Federation of the Philippines or simply SBP). A 1936 founding member of FIBA Asia, Philippines is one of the oldest teams and has one of Asia's longest basketball traditions. The team won a bronze medal in the 1954 FIBA World Championship for men, the best finish by any team outside the Americas and Europe. Also, the team took a fifth-place finish in 1936 Summer Olympics, the best finish by any team outside the Americas, Europe and Oceania. The Philippines has the most wins in the Olympics among teams outside the Americas, Europe and Oceania.

Aside from the bronze medal at the FIBA World Cup and the fifth-place Olympic finish, the Philippines has won five FIBA Asia Cups (formerly FIBA Asia Championship), four Asian Games men's basketball gold medals, seven SEABA Championships, all but one Southeast Asian Games men's basketball gold medals, and has the most titles in Southeast Asia Basketball Association men's championship, being considered as the powerhouse team in Southeast Asia and one of Asia's elite basketball team. The country has also participated in five FIBA World Cups and seven Olympic Basketball Tournaments.

Gilas Pilipinas and the  Gilas Cadets represent the current men's national team while Batang Gilas Pilipinas Under-19 and Under-17 represent the current junior's national team.

Gilas Pilipinas

FIBA Basketball World Cup

By matches
Updated to matches played at the 2019 FIBA Basketball World Cup

Head to head record
Updated to matches played at the 2019 FIBA Basketball World Cup

Olympic Games

FIBA World Olympic Qualifying Tournament

FIBA Asia Cup

FIBA Asia Challenge

Asian Games

SEABA Championship

SEABA Cup

Southeast Asian Games

Batang Gilas U-19

FIBA U-19 World

FIBA U-18 Asian

SEABA U-18

Batang Gilas U-17

FIBA U-17 World

FIBA U-16 Asian

SEABA U-16

3x3 Senior

Olympic Games

FIBA 3x3 Olympic Qualifying Tournament

FIBA 3x3 World Cup

FIBA 3x3 Asia Cup

Asian Indoor Games

Southeast Asian Games 3x3 Tournament

3x3 Junior

FIBA 3x3 U-23 World

FIBA 3x3 U-18 World

Youth Olympics

FIBA 3x3 U-18 Asian

See also
Philippines men's national basketball team in FIBA club tournaments

References

major